Sylvia Delores Miller Horton, known as Dodie Horton (born December 1956), is a Republican from Haughton, Louisiana, who is the state representative for District 9 in Bossier Parish in the northwestern corner of her state.

In January 2016, Horton succeeded Henry Burns of Bossier City, who left the House seat to seek the District 36 position in the Louisiana State Senate. Horton had been Burns' legislative assistant since he entered the House in 2008.

In the primary election held on October 24, 2015, Horton handily defeated a single opponent, fellow Republican Mike McHalffey (born March 1959) of Benton, 4,584 votes (63.8 percent) to 2,602 (36.2 percent), for the right to succeed Burns.

On June 8, 2017, Democratic state Senator Karen Carter Peterson of New Orleans shouted an obscenity at Representative Horton after Horton asked a group of senators present on the House floor to stop talking so that the budget proceedings being considered could be heard. Peterson later apologized for her verbal attack.

Horton and her husband, Gary Lynn Horton (born November 1953), married in 1976. They have three daughters. She is Southern Baptist.

Horton is strongly opposed to increasing taxes. The House voted in May 2019 to roll back a sales tax hike of 0.45 percent that was scheduled to expire in 2025, but Hortman said that she is pessimistic about the tax being reduced because so many Republicans in the state Senate are not conservatives. "Not all Republicans are equal," she said.

Im March 2022, Horton authored House Bill 837 that would punish schools, teachers and administrators for discussing any topics in classrooms that related to LGBTQ American individuals, their lives and their families. Stating that "my bill is an attempt to protect our most innocent from indoctrination of any kind." Horton went on to claim that sexual orientation is a choice.

References

1956 births
Living people
People from Haughton, Louisiana
Republican Party members of the Louisiana House of Representatives
Women state legislators in Louisiana
Women in Louisiana politics
Baptists from Louisiana
Place of birth missing (living people)
21st-century American politicians
21st-century American women politicians